Vachellia constricta, also known commonly as the whitethorn acacia, is a shrub native to Mexico and the Southwestern United States, with a disjunct eastern population in Virginia and Maryland.

Distribution
In the Southwest V. constricta grows in the southern half of Arizona, extending into New Mexico and West Texas. It grows in Mexico as far south as Oaxaca, with small disjunct populations in Baja California and in the Magdalena Plain of Baja California Sur.

In the Sonoran Desert, Vachellia constricta grows in arroyos and washes, where it blooms in late spring (April–May), with a second round of blooms in July–October. Blooming requires a minimum amount of rain, followed by a period of warmth.

Description
Its stems range from a light gray to a mahogany color, with pairs of straight white spines anywhere from 0.5 to 2 cm long.

The small leaves are even-pinnate, usually 2.5–4 cm in length, with each of the 3–9 pairs of pinnae made of 4–16 pairs of leaflets, which are about 3.5 mm long and 1 mm wide. The flowers occur in small yellow balls about 1 cm in diameter. The flowers offer no nectar and little pollen, and so tend to have few visitors. Extrafloral nectaries grow along the main stem of the compound leaves and attract ants to the trees. The seed pods are relatively long and thin, up to 12 cm long but only 3–6 mm wide.

The leaves may drop in response to either dryness or cold.

Varieties

Cultivation
Vachellia constricta is cultivated by specialty plant nurseries as an ornamental plant. It is used in native plant desert habitat gardens. It can be trained as a small tree or grown as a barrier hedges.

References

General references
 Raymond M. Turner, Janice E. Bowers, and Tony L. Burgess, Sonoran Desert Plants: an Ecological Atlas (Tucson: The University of Arizona Press, 1995) pp. 15–16

External links

 USDA Plants profile: Vachellia constricta (as Acacia constricta)
 USFS: Vachellia constricta (as Acacia constricta)
 Lady Bird Johnson Wildflower Center

constricta
Flora of the South-Central United States
Flora of the Southwestern United States
Flora of Mexico
Flora of the Sonoran Deserts
North American desert flora
Flora of Virginia
Flora without expected TNC conservation status